Brightwell Manor is a manor house in the village of Brightwell-cum-Sotwell, Oxfordshire, England. It is part-Tudor with the front being Georgian, the rear Tudor, and probably dates back to the mid-17th century. It has been Grade II listed since 1952.

History

In 1933, the house was purchased by William Inge, a theologian thrice-nominated for the Nobel Prize in Literature. His wife wrote in her diary "It is a most attractive house but rather small." and that she had written to Paul Edward Paget and his partner John Seely (later John Seely, 2nd Baron Mottistone) about adding to it. They wanted £2,000, and she wrote that "We really must try to cut them down a bit." William Inge died there in 1954 (and is buried next door in the churchyard), and the family owned the house until 1971, when his sons sold it. Since 1971 it has been owned by the same family, until Boris Johnson agreed to buy it in February 2023 for a reported £4 million.

In 1952, Brightwell Manor was Grade II listed by Historic England. The house probably dates back to the mid-17th century, and the front is mid-18th century. It is part-Tudor and part-Georgian, with a 1950s extension added by Inge. Pevsner describes Brightwell as a "plain late 18th century brick box", but notes the dating of 1605 on the earlier, rear portion of the house.

The study includes a mural painted by the neo-Romanticist George Warner Allen.

Notes

References

External links 

Country houses in Oxfordshire
Grade II listed houses in Oxfordshire
Buildings and structures completed in the 1600s
Houses with moats